Hampton County is a rural county located in the U.S. state of South Carolina. As of the 2020 census, the population was 18,561. Its county seat is Hampton. It was named for Confederate Civil War general Wade Hampton, who in the late 1870s, with the ending of Reconstruction, was elected as governor of South Carolina.

History
The county is named for Wade Hampton III, one of the country's leading slaveowners and a Lieutenant General for the Confederacy during the American Civil War. After the war, he led the Redeemers and Red Shirts on a campaign to reestablish Democratic rule South Carolina. At the end of the Reconstruction era he became Governor and then U.S. Senator from South Carolina.

The county had a peak of population in 1910, when agriculture was still the mainstay of the economy. Thousands of African Americans left after that for urban areas, especially in the North, in the Great Migration. The mechanization of agriculture reduced farm jobs.

Geography

National protected area
 Ernest F. Hollings ACE Basin National Wildlife Refuge (part)

State and local protected areas
 James W Webb Wildlife Center and Game Management Area
 Lake Warren State Park

Major water bodies 
 Coosawhatchie River
 Lake George Warren
 Little Salkehatchie River
 Salkehatchie River
 Savannah River

Adjacent counties
 Bamberg County - north
 Colleton County - east
 Beaufort County - southeast
 Jasper County - south
 Effingham County, Georgia - southwest
 Screven County, Georgia - west
 Allendale County - northwest

Major highways

Major infrastructure 
 Yemassee Station

Demographics

2020 census

As of the 2020 United States census, there were 18,561 people, 6,993 households, and 4,148 families residing in the county.

2010 census
As of the 2010 United States Census, there were 21,090 people, 7,598 households, and 5,211 families living in the county. The racial makeup of the county was 53.9% black or African American, 42.7% white, 0.5% Asian, 0.3% American Indian, 1.3% from other races, and 1.3% from two or more races. Those of Hispanic or Latino origin made up 3.5% of the population. In terms of ancestry, 6.4% were Irish, 6.3% were American, 5.6% were German, and 5.3% were English.

Of the 7,598 households, 35.8% had children under the age of 18 living with them, 44.0% were married couples living together, 19.1% had a female householder with no husband present, 31.4% were non-families, and 28.1% of all households were made up of individuals. The average household size was 2.57 and the average family size was 3.15. The median age was 38.4 years.

The median income for a household in the county was $34,846 and the median income for a family was $43,234. Males had a median income of $31,935 versus $26,826 for females. The per capita income for the county was $16,262. About 17.2% of families and 20.8% of the population were below the poverty line, including 27.9% of those under age 18 and 19.7% of those age 65 or over.

2000 census
As of the census of 2000, there were 21,386 people, 7,444 households, and 5,315 families living in the county. The population density was 38 people per square mile (15/km2). There were 8,582 housing units at an average density of 15 per square mile (6/km2). The racial makeup of the county was 55.67% Black or African American, 42.89% White, 0.20% Native American, 0.17% Asian, 0.01% Pacific Islander, 0.62% from other races, and 0.43% from two or more races.  2.56% of the population were Hispanic or Latino of any race.

There were 7,444 households, out of which 34.60% had children under the age of 18 living with them, 47.90% were married couples living together, 18.80% had a female householder with no husband present, and 28.60% were non-families. 25.80% of all households were made up of individuals, and 11.20% had someone living alone who was 65 years of age or older. The average household size was 2.64 and the average family size was 3.19.

In the county, the population was spread out, with 27.60% under the age of 18, 8.50% from 18 to 24, 29.70% from 25 to 44, 22.10% from 45 to 64, and 12.10% who were 65 years of age or older. The median age was 35 years. For every 100 females there were 103.80 males. For every 100 females age 18 and over, there were 103.90 males.

The median income for a household in the county was $28,771, and the median income for a family was $34,559. Males had a median income of $29,440 versus $20,418 for females. The per capita income for the county was $13,129. About 17.80% of families and 21.80% of the population were below the poverty line, including 27.60% of those under age 18 and 21.70% of those age 65 or over.

Government and politics

Communities

Towns

 Brunson
 Estill
 Fairfax (mostly in Allendale County)
 Furman
 Gifford
 Hampton (county seat and largest town)
 Luray
 Scotia
 Varnville
 Yemassee (partly in Beaufort County)

Unincorporated communities
 Crocketville
 Lena
 McPhersonville
 Nixville

See also
 List of counties in South Carolina
 National Register of Historic Places listings in Hampton County, South Carolina
 South Carolina State Parks
 National Wildlife Refuge

References

External links

 
 
 Hampton County History and Images

 
1878 establishments in South Carolina
Populated places established in 1878
Black Belt (U.S. region)
Majority-minority counties in South Carolina